The biennial World Investment Forum (WIF) is organized by the United Nations Conference on Trade and Development (UNCTAD) to promote investment for sustainable development and facilitate policy dialogue among a diverse community of investment stakeholders. The forum brings together policymakers, including Heads of State and Government, Ministers and other government officials responsible for investment; representatives from the private sector, including CEOs; international organisations working in the area of sustainable development and poverty reduction; thought leaders from academia and research institutions; and other members of the international investment community, including treaty negotiators, investment promotion and location experts, heads of sovereign wealth funds, heads of stock exchanges, and NGOs.

Background 

International investors, including foreign direct investment (FDI) by large corporations, or TNCs, can provide a significant source of external finance for many developing countries. Such investment has the potential to contribute to capital accumulation in those countries and provide employment and other benefits, such as the provision of infrastructure and the transfer of technology and management know-how.

However, such outcomes are not automatically guaranteed. Countries increasingly need to align their investment policies with policies in other areas, such as trade and industrial development, to both encourage foreign investors and to ensure that countries reap the development benefits of international investment. The World Investment Forum's mission is to provide a platform where a debate on "investment for development" can take place and ultimately to promote investment flows that contribute to sustainable and inclusive development. With its ties to UN member States, the forum is able to bring together a broad coalition of investment stakeholders at the highest level who can influence the global investment landscape. The WIF has been described by former US President Bill Clinton as "an essential platform for the international community to accelerate investment and encourage sustainable development in … the world's poorest countries".

History of the World Investment Forum

The WIF 2008 

The inaugural World Investment Forum was held in Accra, Ghana, on the occasion of the twelfth UNCTAD Ministerial Conference in April 2008. It focused on the future of foreign direct investment (FDI) flows: where FDI will come from and which sectors and regions will be the main targets of these flows, as well as the features of corporate strategies that will drive cross-border investment.

The WIF 2010 

The second UNCTAD World Investment Forum took place in Xiamen, China, in September 2010. The forum consolidated its main mission to promote investment for sustainable development and provide a platform that could bring together the international investment community at the highest level. The 2010 forum examined some of the development challenges and opportunities presented by the post-crisis investment landscape. It also provided inputs into the formulation of a new generation of national and international investment policies to foster sustainable development and the achievement of the Millennium Development Goals.

With more than 1,800 participants from 120 countries, including nine heads of State, 79 ministerial-level officials and 1,160 senior business executives, the second forum established the WIF as arguably the most influential platform for open, inclusive, and high-level international investment discourse.

The WIF 2010 also established some of the forum's signature events, such as the International Investment Agreement (IIA) Conference, which focused on key systemic and developmental challenges facing the IIA regime and the investor-State dispute settlement system. Its emphasis on "investment underpinned by sustainable development" paved the way for the drafting of UNCTAD's Investment Policy Framework for Sustainable Development, which was launched during WIF 2012. Another development-centered conference was hosted on Sustainable Stock Exchanges, highlighting the environmental, social, and governance dimensions of listed companies and how stock exchanges can help foster responsible long-term approaches to investment.

The WIF 2012 

The third forum was held in Doha, Qatar, alongside the thirteenth UNCTAD Ministerial Conference, in April 2012. The event addressed the investment challenges and opportunities arising from emerging global economic governance structures and contributed to the development of policy options and partnerships for promoting sustainable investment to foster inclusive growth.

Against the backdrop of the global financial crisis and crisis-related unrest, notably in the Arab region, the WIF 2012 explored how international investment could be made more inclusive and contribute to addressing some of the perceived causes of economic and social unrest, such as unemployment. Participants debated ways in which governments could attract international investors to support economic transformation and set countries on a path towards sustainable and inclusive development.

More than 1,400 investment stakeholders from 145 countries participated in WIF 2012's fifteen main events, as well as its other networking meetings and side events. Among the countries represented, high-level policymakers from more than 30 least-developed countries (LDCs) took part in the forum, giving credence to the forum's aim of promoting pro-poor investment in these economies. The World Investment Leaders' Summit, one of the forum's key events, brought together eight Heads and former Heads of State and Government and six global CEOs, while the Ministerial Roundtable gathered together over 30 ministerial-level participants. Reflecting the increasing prominence of Sovereign wealth funds (SWFs), the 2012 forum brought together SWF executives and government ministers for the first time at the WIF.

The 2012 forum led to the high-level recognition and endorsement by ministers and Heads of State and government of investment for sustainable development as a principle for policymaking and investor decisions, and the launch of three of UNCTAD's investment-related policy tools: namely the Investment Policy Framework for Sustainable Development, the Entrepreneurship Policy Framework, and a new accounting development toolkit.

In addition to its political focus on shaping investment policy and thinking, the forum also emphasizes its networking opportunities and achieving practical outcomes through the facilitation of investment deals. An example of this at the 2012 forum was the consultations between the government of Comoros and Nestlé, which led to an undertaking by Nestlé to explore investment opportunities on the island for the production of vanilla bourbon.

The WIF also recognizes outstanding public and private achievements in the investment arena: The 2012 Investment Promotion Awards acknowledged investment promotion agencies' endeavours to leverage investment for job creation and skills development; and the EMPRETEC Women in Business Awards honoured women-owned businesses that have benefited from the business development services of the Empretec programme (an UNCTAD programme for the promotion of entrepreneurship that operates in 33 developing countries).

The WIF 2014 

The next World Investment Forum will take place in the Palais des Nations in Geneva, Switzerland, from the 13–16 October 2014. The forum aims to be the biggest yet with a greater number of events spread over more days. Registration is now open on the WIF website and updates are available by following UNCTAD Investment on Twitter.

External links 
 Division on Investment and Enterprise
 World Investment Forum Website
 World Investment Report Series
 Sustainable Stock Exchange Initiative

References

United Nations conferences